Eliphalet Lockwood (October 27, 1675 – October 14, 1753) was a member of the Connecticut House of Representatives from Norwalk, Connecticut Colony in the session of May 1724.

He was the son of Ephraim Lockwood and Mercy St. John Lockwood and the brother of James Lockwood.

References 

1675 births
1753 deaths
Burials in Mill Hill Burying Ground
Deacons
Members of the Connecticut House of Representatives
Politicians from Norwalk, Connecticut